Midtre Gauldal is a municipality in Trøndelag county, Norway. It is part of the Gauldalen region. The administrative centre of the municipality is the village of Støren. Other villages in the municipality include Singsås, Soknedal, Enodden, and Rognes.

The  municipality is the 44th largest by area out of the 356 municipalities in Norway. Midtre Gauldal is the 154th most populous municipality in Norway with a population of 6,120.

General information
Midtre Gauldal was established as a new municipality on 1 January 1964 after the merger of the old municipalities of Budal (population: 529), Singsås (population: 1,554), Soknedal (population: 1,916), and Støren (population: 2,296). On 1 January 2018, the municipality switched from the old Sør-Trøndelag county to the new Trøndelag county.

Name
The name Midtre Gauldal was created in 1964. The first element is the Norwegian word Midtre meaning "middle" and the last part is Gauldal which is the name of the valley through which the river Gaula flows. Therefore, the meaning of the name is "the middle part of Gauldalen".

Coat of arms
The coat of arms was granted on 17 December 1982. The official blazon is "Vert, three crosses in pall conjoined argent". This means the arms have a green field (background) and the charge is a design made up of three crosses, joined in the middle, which makes a Y-shaped figure. The charge has a tincture of argent which means it is commonly colored white, but if it is made out of metal, then silver is used. The crossed-Y design has several meanings. First, it symbolizes the landscape which is based on the meeting of the main Gauldal and Soknedal valleys at the village of Støren. Furthermore, the municipality has a major Y-shaped road-and-railway junction. Finally, the Budal Church, dating from 1745 is one of the oldest and one of the few remaining Y-shaped churches in the country. The arms were designed by Halvor Aune. The municipal flag has the same design as the coat of arms.

Churches
The Church of Norway has four parishes within the municipality of Holtålen. It is part of the Gauldal prosti (deanery) in the Diocese of Nidaros.

Geography

The municipality is bordered by Meldal municipality to the west, Rennebu municipalities to the south-west, Melhus and Selbu municipalities to the north, Holtålen municipality to the east, and Os and Tynset municipalities (in Hedmark county) to the south-east.

The lake Samsjøen is located in the northern part of the municipality. The Gauldalen valley follows the Gaula River through the municipality. The mountain Forollhogna lies on the southern border of the municipality inside Forollhogna National Park.

Climate
Kotsøy village in Midtre Gauldal is situated in the Gaula river valley close to Gaula river, surrounded by steep hills covered with spruce forest. The climate is boreal, but with fairly mild winters for this climate type, and not far from humid continental climate. The record high  was recorded July 25, 2019. The record low  was recorded February 2010, and the January record low is also from 2010.

Government
All municipalities in Norway, including Midtre Gauldal, are responsible for primary education (through 10th grade), outpatient health services, senior citizen services, unemployment and other social services, zoning, economic development, and municipal roads. The municipality is governed by a municipal council of elected representatives, which in turn elect a mayor. The municipality falls under the Trøndelag District Court and the Frostating Court of Appeal.

Municipal council
The municipal council of Midtre Gauldal is made up of 33 representatives that are elected to four-year terms. The party breakdown of the council is as follows:

Mayors
The mayors of Midtre Gauldal:

1964–1967: Jacob Hindbjørgen (Ap)
1968–1975: Ola Birger Vagnild (Sp)
1976–1983: Oddbjørn Snøfugl (Sp)
1984–1987: Anders Storrøsæter (Sp)
1988–1995: Fredrik Busklein (Sp)
1995–2003: Kolbjørn Tangvik (Ap)
2003–2015: Erling Lenvik (Ap)
2015–present: Sivert Moen (Sp)

Media

The newspaper Gauldalsposten is published in Midtre Gauldal.

Transportation
European route E6 crosses the municipality from north to south. The Dovrebanen and Rørosbanen railway lines also cross the municipality. Some of the stations on those lines include Støren Station and Singsås Station.

Notable people 
 Vincents Stoltenberg Bull (1882 in Støren – 1935) a Norwegian engineer and businessperson
 Oddbjørn Snøfugl (born 1941) a Norwegian politician, lives in Støren 
 Karl Erik Zachariassen (1942–2009) a Norwegian entomologist, lived in Soknedal
 Helge Anshushaug (born 1948 in Soknedal) a retired sport shooter, competed at the 1972 and 1976 Summer Olympics

References

External links

Municipal fact sheet from Statistics Norway 

 
Municipalities of Trøndelag
1964 establishments in Norway